Israel made their Eurovision Young Musicians debut at the Eurovision Young Musicians 1986, where they failed to qualify for the final.

Participation overview

See also
Israel in the Eurovision Song Contest
Israel in the Junior Eurovision Song Contest

References

External links 
 Eurovision Young Musicians

Countries in the Eurovision Young Musicians
Israel in the Eurovision Song Contest